Propylene glycol methyl ether acetate (PGMEA, 1-methoxy-2-propanol acetate) is a P-type glycol ether used in inks, coatings, and cleaners.  It is sold by Dow Chemical under the name Dowanol PMA, by Shell Chemical under the name methyl proxitol acetate, and by Eastman under the name PM Acetate.

In the semiconductor industry, PGMEA is a commonly used solvent, primarily for the application of surface adherents such as Bis(trimethylsilyl)amine (HMDS) on silicon wafers. The compound is often the most abundant airborne, molecular contamination (AMC) in semiconductor cleanrooms, due to its evaporation into ambient air.

References

Glycol ethers
Acetate esters